Alexandre Grandazzi (born 8 February 1957) is a French university professor, a specialist of archaeology and Roman history.

University career 
 Former student of the École normale supérieure (class 1976 Lettres)
 Agrégé de lettres classiques
 Former member of the École française de Rome
 Professor at the Latin UFR dof the Université de Paris-Sorbonne.

Principal publications

External links 
 Alexandre Grandazzi, Alba Longa. Histoire d’une légende on Revue de l'histoire des religions
 Alexandre Grandazzi, La fondation de Rome. Réflexion sur l'histoire. (compte rendu) on Persée
 Alexandre Grandazzi on France Culture (audio)

French scholars of Roman history
20th-century French historians
21st-century French historians
Latin–French translators
École Normale Supérieure alumni
French Latinists
1957 births
Living people